The 1923 Women's Olympiad (and ) was the fourth international event in women's sports, the tournament was held 4 to 7 April 1923 in Monte Carlo, Monaco. The tournament was formally called "Les Jeux Athlétiques Féminins à Monté Carlo". The games were a runner-up to the 1921 Women's Olympiad and 1922 Women's Olympiad.

Events
The multi-sport event was as previous years organised by Fédération des Sociétés Féminines Sportives de France (FSFSF) under chairwoman Alice Milliat and Camille Blanc, director of the "International Sporting Club de Monaco" as a response to the International Olympic Committee (IOC) decision not to include women's events in the 1924 Olympic Games.

The games were attended by participants from 8 nations:  Belgium, Czechoslovakia, Denmark, France, Italy, Monaco, Switzerland and the United Kingdom. The tournament was a huge promotion for women's sports.

The athletes competed in 11 events: running (60 metres, 250 metres, 800 metres, 4 x 75 metres relay, 4 x 175 metres relay and hurdling 65 metres), high jump, long jump, javelin, shot put and Athletics pentathlon. The tournament also held exhibition events in basketball, gymnastics and rhythmic gymnastics.

The tournament was held at the "Tir aux Pigeons" in the gardens Les jardins du Casino of the Monte Carlo Casino in the ward of Monte Carlo. Among the spectators were Prince Louis II, Princess Charlotte and Prince Pierre.

Prior to the tournament a gymnastics event ("La Quatrième Fête Fédérale de Gymnastique et d'Éducation Physique Féminines" in the ward of Fontvieille with about 1200 participants from 71 gymnastic clubs (this event is sometimes confused with the athletic event).

Results
Almost all medals went to athletes from France and the United Kingdom, medalists for each event:

 Each athlete in the shot put and javelin throw events threw using their right hand, then their left. Their final mark was the total of the best mark with their right-handed throw and the best mark with their left-handed throw.

Sophie Eliott-Lynn later also competed at the 1926 Women's World Games in Gothenburg where she finished fourth in the javelin event.

Marie Janderová competed in the javelin event, her result of 25,50 metres was a world record, however she finished fifth in the totals with 42,11 metres.

world record holder in 800 metres Georgette Lenoir and world record holder in shot put Violette Morris also competed at the games but without gaining any medals.

The basketball tournament was won by Team France after a win in the final against Team England with 19-1.

A special commemorative medal was issued for the participants.

Legacy
The tournament was a huge promotion for women's sports. However it was the last of three Women's Olympiads. The event continued as Women's World Games with the first event already being held in Paris in 1922.

References

External links
 picture high jump Ivy Lowman (L'Équipe.fr)
 picture running event (L'Équipe.fr)
 picture hurdles event (Getty Images)
 newspaper Le Petit Journal Illustré cover (22 April 1923)
 newspaper Le Petit Journal Illustré in french (22 April 1923) (Bibliothèque nationale de France – BnF)
 pictures (Národní muzeum Česka /National museum Czech Republic)
 film gymnastics event (British Pathé)
 film gymnastics event (YouTube)
 Participation medal

Women's World Games
International sports competitions hosted by Monaco
1923 in multi-sport events
1923 in sports
1923 in Monaco
Multi-sport events in Monaco
1923 in women's sport
Women's Olympiad